My Friend, Dr. Jekyll, is a 1960 Italian comedy film directed by Marino Girolami. It is a parody of the Robert Louis Stevenson's 1886 novella Strange Case of Dr Jekyll and Mr Hyde.

Plot summary

In 20th century Italy, Giacinto Floria is a tutor in a rehabilitation center for former prostitutes. Floria is kidnapped each night by Professor Fabius who transfers his mind into Floria's making him a crazed sex fiend. A detective later discovers this is happening and frees Floria from her kidnapper while the Professor mind ends up within the body of a monkey at a zoo.

Cast 
 Ugo Tognazzi as Giacinto Floria 
 Raimondo Vianello as Prof. Fabius
 Abbe Lane as Mafalda de Matteis
 Hélène Chanel as Rossana 
 Carlo Croccolo as Arguzio 
 Linda Sini as Adelaide 
 Luigi Pavese as Colonel Rolando 
 Anna Campori as Clarissa de Matteis  
  Elena Fontana as Loredana 
 Maria Fiè as Mara
 Angela Portaluri as Fanny
 Dori Dorika as Yvonne Trelati Norcia
 Ivanna Gilli as Margot

Release
My Friend, Dr. Jekyll was released in Italy on August 11, 1960 where it was distributed by Incei Film. It grossed a total of 157 million Italian Lira on its initial theatrical run.

The film received a release in the United States in March 1965 through Union Film Distributors. The film was acquired by Dick Randall through the purchase of Sam Fleishmann's shares in the company. It has not been released on home video as of 2015.

References

Notes

Bibliography

External links

1960 films
1960s parody films
Films set in Italy
Dr. Jekyll and Mr. Hyde films
Films directed by Marino Girolami
Italian parody films
Films with screenplays by Marino Girolami
1960 comedy films
Films with screenplays by Giulio Scarnicci
1960s Italian films